Monmouth Junction is an unincorporated community and census designated place (CDP) located within South Brunswick Township, in Middlesex County, New Jersey, United States. As of the 2010 United States Census, the CDP's population was 2,887.

Geography
According to the United States Census Bureau, the CDP had a total area of 1.483 square miles (3.842 km2), of which, 1.468 square miles (3.803 km2) of it was land and 0.015 square miles (0.039 km2) of it (1.01%) was water.

Demographics

Census 2010

Census 2000
As of the 2000 United States Census there were 2,721 people, 870 households, and 736 families living in the CDP. The population density was 700.4/km2 (1,819.2/mi2). There were 881 housing units at an average density of 226.8/km2 (589.0/mi2). The racial makeup of the CDP was 74.97% White, 7.09% African American, 0.37% Native American, 14.48% Asian, 1.18% from other races, 1.91% from two or more races. Hispanic or Latino of any race were 4.15% of the population.

There were 870 households, out of which 53.4% had children under the age of 18 living with them, 73.4% were married couples living together, 9.1% had a female householder with no husband present, and 15.3% were non-families. 11.8% of all households were made up of individuals, and 1.8% had someone living alone who was 65 years of age or older. The average household size was 3.12 and the average family size was 3.42.

In the CDP the population was spread out, with 31.5% under the age of 18, 5.7% from 18 to 24, 34.8% from 25 to 44, 23.8% from 45 to 64, and 4.2% who were 65 years of age or older. The median age was 35 years. For every 100 females, there were 97.5 males. For every 100 females age 18 and over, there were 96.7 males.

The median income for a household in the CDP was $89,598, and the median income for a family was $94,247. Males had a median income of $64,688 versus $39,464 for females. The per capita income for the CDP was $35,134. About 4.2% of families and 5.1% of the population were below the poverty line, including 11.2% of those under age 18 and none of those age 65 or over.

Education
South Brunswick Public Schools is the local school district.

Religion

It was established in October 1991, and in 1993 had 20-25 attendees per Sunday church worship.

Notable people

People who were born in, residents of, or otherwise closely associated with Monmouth Junction include:

 Walter Perez, weekend morning co-anchor, journalist and weekday reporter for WPVI-TV, the ABC network affiliate in Philadelphia.
 DeForest Soaries (born 1951), pastor, politician and former Secretary of State of New Jersey and former chairman of the federal Election Assistance Commission.

See also
Red Maple Farm

References

Census-designated places in Middlesex County, New Jersey
South Brunswick, New Jersey